Pavel Složil (born 29 December 1955) is a former professional tennis player from Czechoslovakia.

Složil enjoyed most of his tennis success while playing doubles. During his career, he won 32 doubles titles and finished runner-up an additional 29 times, including at the French Open in.

Slozil and his partner, Renata Tomanová (also from Czechoslovakia), won the 1978 French Open mixed-doubles championship, defeating Virginia Ruzici (Romania) and Patrice Dominguez (France). The mixed doubles championship was an important event in those days, contested by top players, with John McEnroe and Mary Carillo having won the year before.

In 1985, Složil achieved a career-high doubles ranking of world No. 4.

Složil participated in eleven Davis Cup ties for Czechoslovakia from 1978 to 1986, posting a 7–2 record in doubles and a 4–2 record in singles. He was a member of the winning Czech Davis Cup team in 1980, along with teammates Ivan Lendl, Tomáš Šmíd and Jan Kodeš.

Složil served as Steffi Graf's coach from November 1986 until the end of 1991. Shortly after the start of his tenure as Graf's coach, she had her Grand Slam breakthrough year in 1987, winning six tournaments and then defeating Martina Navratilova in the French Open. Graf went on to be a finalist at Wimbledon and the US Open, losing both times to Navratilova. The next year, Graf achieved a calendar year's Grand Slam, a feat performed only twice before. She also won the 1988 Olympics singles and the Wimbledon ladies' doubles that same year.

From 1987 through 1991, coached by Složil, Graf won ten Grand Slam singles championships, winning the Australian Open (1988–89-90), the French Open (1987–88), Wimbledon (1988–89-91) and the US Open (1988–89), plus numerous side tournaments.

He subsequently served as coach for Jennifer Capriati, Anna Kournikova and Magdalena Maleeva between 1992 and 1999.

In 2002, he began work at the World Tennis Club in Naples, Florida. He served there as Tennis Director until 2014 when he began coaching and teaching at the Sanchez-Casal Tennis Academy, also in Naples. There he works with the junior players in the morning and continues to teach tennis to a wide range of players.

Career finals

Singles (2 titles, 3 runner-ups)

Doubles (32 titles, 29 runner-ups)

External links
 
 
 

1955 births
Living people
Czech male tennis players
Czechoslovak male tennis players
French Open champions
Sportspeople from Opava
Grand Slam (tennis) champions in mixed doubles
Universiade medalists in tennis
Steffi Graf
Universiade gold medalists for Czechoslovakia
Medalists at the 1977 Summer Universiade